The Bucharest–Giurgiu Motorway, labelled A5, is a proposed motorway in the southern part of Romania, located in the historical region of Muntenia and running along the Pan-European Corridor IX.

History and status
The status of what could be the A5 motorway is unclear, with construction works on the motorway unlikely to begin before 2030, especially since the adjacent road which the motorway would double, the National Road 5 (DN5), was upgraded throughout the 2000s to a road with dual carriageway and at-grade junctions without a hard shoulder (emergency lane). Moreover, a new expressway (termed DN5D) that would bypass the city of Giurgiu in the east (about 6 km long) opened in 2021, but this serves only as a connection to the existing Giurgiu border checkpoint and the Friendship Bridge over the Danube. Regardless, building the A5 motorway is only a long-term plan for the Romanian government.

In the past, the Brașov - Bacău (Răcăciuni) motorway (162 km) used to be labelled A5. It was eventually merged with the Sibiu - Brașov motorway (120 km), forming a 282-kilometre long A13 motorway. The route number A5 was since reserved for a eventual motorway between Bucharest and Giurgiu.

See also
Giurgiu East bypass - a road built to expressway-like standards designated the DN5D
Roads in Romania
Transport in Romania

References

Proposed roads in Romania
Motorways in Romania